Wilson Arap Chuma Kiprugut (1938 – 1 November 2022) was a Kenyan sprinter and middle-distance runner. He competed at the 1964 Tokyo and 1968 Mexico Olympics and won two medals in the 800 metres event; in 1964 he also ran 400 metres, but failed to reach the final. He was the first person from Kenya ever to win an Olympic medal.

At the 1962 Commonwealth Games, Kiprugut was part of the Kenyan 4 × 440 yards relay team which finished fifth. At the 1966 Commonwealth Games, he won the 880 yards silver medal. He won two gold medals (in the 400 and 800 metres) at the inaugural All-Africa Games in 1965.

In 2010, he won the Kenyan Sports Personality of the Year award.

Kiprugut grew up in Kericho and began running as a child while at Kaptebeswet Primary School and Sitotwet Intermediate School. His talent was first identified when he ran at the East and Central African Championships – an event where he won no less than three 880-yard titles.

Kiprugut died on 1 November 2022, at the age of 84.

References

External links
 

1938 births
2022 deaths
People from Kericho County
Kenyan male middle-distance runners
Olympic athletes of Kenya
Olympic silver medalists for Kenya
Olympic bronze medalists for Kenya
Athletes (track and field) at the 1964 Summer Olympics
Athletes (track and field) at the 1968 Summer Olympics
Commonwealth Games bronze medallists for Kenya
Commonwealth Games medallists in athletics
Athletes (track and field) at the 1962 British Empire and Commonwealth Games
Athletes (track and field) at the 1966 British Empire and Commonwealth Games
Medalists at the 1968 Summer Olympics
Medalists at the 1964 Summer Olympics
Olympic silver medalists in athletics (track and field)
Olympic bronze medalists in athletics (track and field)
African Games gold medalists for Kenya
African Games medalists in athletics (track and field)
Athletes (track and field) at the 1965 All-Africa Games
Medallists at the 1966 British Empire and Commonwealth Games